Älta IF is a Swedish football club located in Älta.

Background
Älta IF currently plays in Division 4 Stockholm Södra which is the sixth tier of Swedish football. They play their home matches at the Älta IP in Älta.

The club is affiliated to Stockholms Fotbollförbund.

Season to season

Footnotes

External links
 Älta IF – Official website

Football clubs in Stockholm
1941 establishments in Sweden
Association football clubs established in 1941